Ardmulchan Passage Tomb is a passage grave and National Monument located in County Meath, Ireland.

Location

History

Ardmulchan Passage Tomb dates to 3000–2500 BC.

Description
Two carved stones bearing megalithic art (two "picked signs" and one "incised sign") were found in 1974 during the construction of a house. A mound of earth nearby may be the remains of a passage grave.

References

National Monuments in County Meath
Archaeological sites in County Meath